Joseph Henderson (December 1869 - December 19, 1938) was a United States Army Sergeant who received the Medal of Honor for actions during the Moro Uprising in 1909. He later obtained the rank of Master Sergeant. Sergeant Henderson was awarded his medal on 23 November 1912, for the same action as Lieutenant Archie Miller.

Henderson joined the army from Fort Leavenworth in March 1899.

Medal of Honor citation
Rank and organization: Sergeant, Troop B, 6th U.S. Cavalry. Place and date: At Patian Island, Philippine Islands, July 2, 1909. Entered service at: Leavenworth, Kans. Birth: Leavenworth, Kans. Date of issue: Unknown.

Citation:

While in action against hostile Moros, voluntarily advanced alone, in the face of a heavy fire, to within about 15 yards of the hostile position and refastened to a tree a block and tackle used in checking the recoil of a mountain gun.

See also

List of Medal of Honor recipients

Notes

References

1869 births
1938 deaths
People from Fort Leavenworth, Kansas
United States Army soldiers
American military personnel of the Philippine–American War
United States Army Medal of Honor recipients
Philippine–American War recipients of the Medal of Honor